Emiliano Bigica (born 4 September 1973) is an Italian former footballer who played as a midfielder.

Honours
Fiorentina
Coppa Italia: 1995–96
Supercoppa Italiana: 1996

References

External links
 

Italian footballers
Italy under-21 international footballers
Serie A players
Serie B players
Serie C players
Potenza S.C. players
S.S.C. Bari players
ACF Fiorentina players
S.S.C. Napoli players
Novara F.C. players
U.S. Salernitana 1919 players
Mantova 1911 players
Association football defenders
Footballers from Bari
1973 births
Living people